The Big Four refers to the four contemporary leading Grand Ayatollahs of Twelver Shia Islam based in the holy city of Najaf in Iraq.

Background

All orthodox Twelver Shia Muslims follow the Islamic rulings of a Grand Ayatollah. Under Saddam Hussein, the clerics were oppressed. At present, the most prominent among them is Ali al-Sistani; who also serves as the head of the Najaf Seminary.

List

References

Grand ayatollahs
Quartets
Najaf
Islamic religious leaders
Lists of Islamic religious leaders
Muslim scholars of Islamic jurisprudence
Religious leadership roles
Titles